"Sunflower" is a song by British singer-songwriter Paul Weller, released in July 1993 as the first single from his solo album, Wild Wood. It reached  16 on the UK Singles Chart upon its release.

Critical reception
Uncut magazine called "Sunflower" a "shaggy, psychedelic exocet", placing it 23rd in its list of Weller's 30 best songs. The Guardian ranked it at number 11 in its list of Weller's top 30 tracks, stating that "more than any song, (it) set Weller's course in the 90s", and describing it as "a twitchy cocktail of Low Spark of High Heeled Boys-era Traffic and soul".

Track listings
CD and 12-inch single
 "Sunflower"
 "Kosmos SXDub 2000"
 "Bull-Rush/Magic Bus" (live at the Royal Albert Hall, London, October 1992)
 "That Spiritual Feeling" (new mix)

7-inch, cassette, and mini-CD single
 "Sunflower"
 "Bull-Rush/Magic Bus" (live at the Royal Albert Hall, London, October 1992)

References

1993 songs
1993 singles
Song recordings produced by Brendan Lynch (music producer)
Songs written by Paul Weller